Events in the year 2016 in Algeria.

Incumbents
 President: Abdelaziz Bouteflika
 Prime Minister of Algeria: Abdelmalek Sellal

Predicted and scheduled events

August
August 5–21 – 38 athletes from Algeria will compete in the 2016 Summer Olympics in Rio de Janeiro, Brazil

 
2010s in Algeria
Years of the 21st century in Algeria